The 1969–70 Divizia C was the 14th season of Liga III, the third tier of the Romanian football league system.

Team changes

To Divizia C
Relegated from Divizia B
 CFR Pașcani
 Medicina Cluj
 Electronica Obor București
 IS Câmpia Turzii

Promoted from County Championship
 Minerul Comănești
 Constructorul Piatra Neamț
 Dunărea Brăila
 Locomotiva Adjud
 Laromet București
 ICAB Arcuda
 Metalul Colibași
 Petrolul Târgoviște
 CFR Caransebeș
 Electromotor Timișoara
 Unirea Orșova
 Independența Sibiu
 Minerul Teliuc
 Viitorul Gheorgheni
 Foresta Năsăud
 Chimistul Baia Mare

From Divizia C
Promoted to Divizia B
 Metalul Târgoviște
 Olimpia Satu Mare
 Știința Bacău
 Minerul Anina

Relegated to County Championship
 Cimentul Bicaz
 Unirea Negrești
 Chimia Mărășești
 Gloria Tecuci
 Ideal Cernavodă
 Aurora Urziceni
 Minerul Câmpulung
 CIL Râmnicu Vâlcea
 Autorapid Craiova
 Șoimii Timișoara
 Progresul Sibiu
 Mureșul Luduș
 Minerul Baia Sprie
 Voința Târnăveni
 CFR Sighișoara

Renamed teams

Metalul Brăila was renamed as Metalurgistul Brăila.

Flamura Roșie Tecuci was renamed as Muncitorul Tecuci.

TUG București was renamed as Sportul Muncitoresc București.

Metalul Colibași was renamed as Dacia Pitești.

Muscelul Câmpulung was renamed as Unirea Câmpulung.

Voința Lugoj was renamed as Vulturii Textila Lugoj.

Energia Turnu Severin was renamed as Energetica Turnu Severin.

Aurul Zlatna was renamed as Minaur Zlatna.

Dinamo Oradea was moved from Oradea to Zalău and renamed as Dinamo Zalău.

Other teams
Medicina Cluj withdrew from Divizia C before the start of the season, instead of them was promoted Dermata Cluj-Napoca.

Unirea Oradea withdrew from Divizia C before the start of the season, instead of them Bradul Vișeul de Sus was spared from relegation.

League tables

Seria I

Seria II

Seria III

Seria IV

Seria V

Seria VI

Seria VII

Seria VIII

Promotion play-off

Group I (Brașov)

Group II (Arad)

See also 

 1969–70 Divizia A
 1969–70 Divizia B
 1969–70 County Championship

References 

Liga III seasons
3
Romania